Hylton Castle is a suburb of Sunderland, Tyne and Wear, England. It is named after the nearby Hylton Castle.

External links
Sunderland : The Northern Suburbs
Hylton Castle at Ordnance Survey

City of Sunderland suburbs
Sunderland